Yvette Tollar is a Canadian jazz vocalist born in Toronto, Ontario. She has released two full-length CDs, Cactus Flowers (2001) and Ima (2008). Ima was a nominee for Vocal Jazz Album of the Year at the 2009 Juno Awards.

Yvette Tollar comes from a musical family. Her brother is Ernie Tollar, who is a Juno and Dora Award-winning saxophonist and woodwind player who has played with jazz vocalist Holly Cole and big band NOJO and composed music for film, theatre and dance. Yvette's sister-in-law is Maryem Hassan Tollar, a Juno and Dora Award-winning World Music vocalist who sang the theme song for the TV show Little Mosque On The Prairie and a featured track on the Bollywood film, Maya Maya. Yvette was married to electric bassist Rich Brown who has played with Steve Coleman, Rudresh Mahanthapa and James Blood Ulmer.

Tollar studied jazz music with vocalist Sheila Jordan in New York and with Joe Lovano, Dave Holland, and Kenny Werner at the Banff Centre for The Arts. She is the recipient of awards and scholarships from The Canada Council for The Arts, The Ontario Arts Council, The Toronto Arts Council, The Banff Centre for The Arts and FACTOR.

Tollar is a professor in The Faculty of Media and Creative Arts at Humber College where she teaches music, voice, songwriting, directed study, master classes and leads ensembles as part of the Bachelor of Music, Music Composition Graduate Certificate and the Introduction to Commercial Jazz programs. She has acted as adjudicator at both the University of Toronto and Humber College.

Discography
Cactus Flowers - 2001
Ima - 2008
Guest appearances 
I Love You by Kevin Breit
The Universe of John Lennon by Michael Occhipinti and Shine On
The Signal by Elizabeth Shepherd
The Art of Breath Volume 1 by John MacMurchy
Simple Earnest Plea by Kevin Breit
Muorica by Sicilian Jazz Project
Sub Urban Gypsy by Dominic Mancuso
The Henry's with Larry Towel Live at The Drake Hotel 2011" by The Henry's and Larry TowelInvented Reality by Jasna JovicevicChoose by The Merlin FactorWeaving by The Toronto Tabla EnsembleFlowers of Forgiveness'' by Mernie

References

External links
 Official website

Year of birth missing (living people)
Living people
Canadian women jazz singers
Musicians from Toronto
21st-century Canadian women singers